Jharna Rahman (born 28 June 1959) is a Bangladeshi writer specialising in short stories, novels, travelogues, essays, non-fiction, and children's books. She was awarded 2021 Bangla Academy Literary Award and 1427 Anannya Literature Award. As of 2021, she has written a total 60 books including Ognita, Shorbotorbari, Perek, Chondrodohon, and Adritar Potaka.

Background and career
Jharna Rahman was born in Dacca, East Pakistan, Pakistan (now Dhaka, Bangladesh) on 28 June 1959 to Md. Mofazzal Hossain and Rahima Begum. She is a faculty member at the Bir Shreshtha Noor Mohammad Public College.

Rahman released Jolpori Onuher Nouka and Juddhodiner Nil Khata in February 2021.

References

Living people
1959 births
Recipients of Bangla Academy Award
Bangladeshi women novelists
Bangladeshi women writers